The 1908 Marquette Blue and Gold football team represented Marquette University during the 1908 college football season.

Schedule

References

Marquette
Marquette Golden Avalanche football seasons
Marquette Blue and Gold football